Caquetaia spectabilis is a species of fish endemic to the basins of the Amazon River, Madeira River, and Uatumã River, as well as the Araguari and the Branco Rivers. The species is an ambush predator that lives among the vegetation on the banks of its habitat rivers.

References

Cichlid fish of South America
spectabilis
Fish described in 1875